Paul Edward Haggis (born March 10, 1953) is a Canadian screenwriter, film producer, and director of film and television. He is best known as screenwriter and producer for consecutive Best Picture Oscar winners Million Dollar Baby (2004) and Crash (2005), the latter of which he also directed. Haggis also co-wrote the war film Flags of Our Fathers (2006) and the James Bond films Casino Royale (2006) and Quantum of Solace (2008). He is the creator of the television series Due South (1994–1999) and co-creator of Walker, Texas Ranger (1993–2001), among others. Haggis is a two-time Academy Award winner, two-time Emmy Award winner, and seven-time Gemini Award winner. He also assisted in the making of "We Are the World 25 for Haiti". In November 2022, he was found liable in a civil trial which alleged he raped publicist Haleigh Breest and he was required to pay $10 million in damages.

Early life
Paul Edward Haggis was born in London, Ontario, the son of Mary Yvonne (née Metcalf) and Ted Haggis, a World War II veteran and Olympic sprinter in the 1948 Summer Olympics. He was raised as a Catholic, attending Catholic school and facing confrontations with children from Ontario's Protestant majority. His family had stopped going to Mass after finding their parish priest driving a Cadillac, and he considered himself an atheist by early adulthood. The Gallery Theatre in London was owned by his parents, and Haggis gained experience in the field through work at the theatre.

Haggis attended St. Thomas More Elementary School. He started secondary school at Ridley College in St. Catharines, but began getting into bad behavior by skipping his required Royal Canadian Army Cadets drills, breaking into the prefect's office to erase his demerits, and reading the radical magazine Ramparts. After a year, Haggis's parents transferred him to a more progressive preparatory school in Muskoka Lakes. Haggis was taught by a producer of the CBC Radio One news program As It Happens, who allowed him to sit with him as he edited John Dean's testimony to the Watergate hearings for broadcast.

After being inspired by Alfred Hitchcock and Jean-Luc Godard, Haggis proceeded to study art at H. B. Beal Secondary School. He opened a theater in Toronto to screen films banned by the Ontario Board of Censors such as The Devils and Last Tango in Paris. After viewing Michelangelo Antonioni's 1966 film Blowup in 1974, he traveled to England with the intent of becoming a fashion photographer. Haggis later returned to Canada to pursue studies in cinematography at Fanshawe College. While in London, Ontario, Haggis was converted to the Church of Scientology. In 1975, Haggis moved to Los Angeles, California, to begin a career in writing in the entertainment industry.

Career
Haggis began to work as a writer for television programs, including Dingbat and the Creeps, Richie Rich, Scooby-Doo and Scrappy-Doo, The Love Boat, One Day at a Time, Diff'rent Strokes, and The Facts of Life. With The Facts of Life, Haggis also gained his first credit as producer. During the 1980s and 1990s, Haggis wrote for television series including thirtysomething, The Tracey Ullman Show, FM, Due South, L.A. Law, and EZ Streets. He helped to create the television series Walker, Texas Ranger; Family Law; and Due South. Haggis served as executive producer of the series Michael Hayes and Family Law. In 1999, he signed a first look deal with Columbia TriStar Television.

He gained recognition in the film industry for his work on the 2004 film Million Dollar Baby, which Allmovie described as a "serious milestone" for the writer/producer, and as "his first high-profile foray into feature film". Haggis had read two stories written by Jerry Boyd, a boxing trainer who wrote under the name of F.X. Toole.

Haggis later acquired the rights to the stories, and developed them into the screenplay for Million Dollar Baby. Clint Eastwood portrayed the lead character in the film. Eastwood also directed the film, and used the screenplay written by Haggis. Million Dollar Baby received four Academy Awards including the Academy Award for Best Picture.

After Million Dollar Baby, Haggis worked on the 2004 film Crash. Haggis came up with the story for the film on his own, and then wrote and directed the film, which allowed him greater control over his work. Crash was his first experience as director of a major feature film. Highly positive upon release, critical reception of Crash has since polarized, although Roger Ebert called it the best film of 2005.

Crash received Academy Award nominations for Best Picture and Best Director, in addition to four other Academy Award nominations. Haggis received two Academy Awards for the film: Best Picture (as its producer), and Best Writing for his work on the screenplay. With Million Dollar Baby and then Crash, Haggis became the first individual to have written Best Picture Oscar-winners in two consecutive years.

Haggis said that he wrote Crash to "bust liberals", arguing that his fellow liberals were not honest with themselves about the nature of race and racism because they believed that most racial problems had already been resolved in American society.

He has been a member of the Academy of Motion Picture Arts and Sciences in the Writer's Branch since 2005. This allows him to vote on the Academy Awards.

In 2008, Haggis founded production company Hwy61 Films with producer Michael Nozik, and signed a deal to produce films for United Artists. The company is named after the title track of Bob Dylan's 1965 album Highway 61 Revisited.

Personal life
Haggis lives in Santa Monica, California. He has three daughters from his first marriage to Diana Gettas and one son from his second marriage to Deborah Rennard. His younger sister, Jo Francis, is a film editor; they have worked together on several projects.

In 2009, Haggis founded the non-profit organization Artists for Peace and Justice to assist impoverished youth in Haiti. In an interview with Dan Rather, Haggis mentioned that he is an atheist.

Break from Scientology
After maintaining active membership in the Church of Scientology for 35 years, Haggis left the organization in October 2009. He was motivated to leave Scientology in reaction to statements made by the San Diego branch of the Church of Scientology in support of Proposition 8, the ballot initiative which banned same-sex marriage in California.

Haggis wrote to Tommy Davis, the Church's spokesman, and requested that he denounce these statements; when Davis remained silent, Haggis responded that "Silence is consent, Tommy. I refuse to consent." Haggis went on to list other grievances against Scientology, including its policy of disconnection, and the smearing of its ex-members through the leaking of their personal details.

The Observer commented on the defections of Haggis and actor Jason Beghe from Scientology, "The decision of Beghe and Haggis to quit Scientology appears to have caused the movement its greatest recent PR difficulties, not least because of its dependence on Hollywood figures as both a source of revenue for its most expensive courses and an advertisement for the religion."

In an interview with Movieline, Haggis was asked about similarities between his film The Next Three Days and his departure from the Scientology organization; Haggis responded, "I think one's life always parallels art and art parallels life." In February 2011, The New Yorker published a 25,000-word story, "The Apostate", by Lawrence Wright, detailing Haggis's allegations about the Church of Scientology. The article ended by quoting Haggis: "I was in a cult for thirty-four years. Everyone else could see it. I don't know why I couldn't." Haggis was interviewed as part of a group of ex-Scientologists for the 2015 movie Going Clear: Scientology and the Prison of Belief.

Sexual misconduct allegations and arrest
In December 2017, Variety reported Haleigh Breest had filed a lawsuit against Paul Haggis regarding an alleged incident in 2013. Haggis denied all allegations and filed a countersuit, claiming Breest intended to bankrupt him by extracting a $9 million settlement. His suit was dismissed.

Variety reported in April 2021 that Haggis had asked a judge to expedite his civil trial. He said he "cannot continue to pay his legal bills." Haggis requested the judge set a trial "at the earliest practical date." His lawyer, Seth Zuckerman, wrote in the motion that "the defendant is no longer in a position to finance his defence with this matter lingering in advance of trial." In July 2019, Haggis was ordered to provide a DNA sample as part of legal proceedings. According to published reports, Haggis and his legal team have worked to block the testimony of additional alleged victims, as the initial civil case headed to trial. Following the initial accusation, three additional women came forward with various accusations of sexual assault and misconduct.

Fellow Scientology defectors Leah Remini and Mike Rinder have defended him, suggesting that the Church of Scientology may be involved, an assertion both the accusers and the Church itself deny.

According to The New York Times and The Guardian, on June 19, 2022, Haggis was arrested in Ostuni in southern Italy over allegations of sexual assault. Local law enforcement charged him with aggravated sexual violence and aggravated personal injuries. A judge of the local court of Brindisi overturned Haggis' house arrest on July 4. On July 29, a three judge panel of the District Court of Lecce unanimously dismissed the charges against Haggis.

On November 10, 2022, a New York jury found Haggis liable for the rape of Breest in a civil suit and ordered him to pay her at least $7.5 million. On November 14, the jury ordered Haggis to pay an additional $2.5 million in punitive damages.

Filmography

Film

Television

Video games

Awards and nominations

See also
 List of Canadian directors
 List of film and television directors
 List of film producers
 List of Big Five Academy Award winners and nominees
 List of people who have won multiple Academy Awards in a single year
 List of people from Santa Monica, California
 List of people from London, Ontario
 Scientology and celebrities
 Scientology controversies

Further reading

References

External links

 
 
 
 

1953 births
Living people
20th-century Canadian male writers
20th-century Canadian screenwriters
21st-century Canadian businesspeople
21st-century Canadian male writers
21st-century Canadian screenwriters
Best Original Screenplay Academy Award winners
Best Original Screenplay BAFTA Award winners
Businesspeople from London, Ontario
Canadian atheists
Canadian emigrants to the United States
Film producers from Ontario
Canadian former Christians
Canadian male screenwriters
Canadian male television writers
Canadian television writers
Critics of Scientology
English-language film directors
Fanshawe College alumni
Film directors from London, Ontario
Former Roman Catholics
Former Scientologists
Canadian LGBT rights activists
Primetime Emmy Award winners
Producers who won the Best Picture Academy Award
Ridley College alumni
Screenwriters from Ontario
Writers from London, Ontario
Writers Guild of America Award winners